The Hotel Norfolk, at 108 N. Fourth St. in Norfolk, Nebraska, was completed in 1926.  It includes Colonial Revival and Georgian Revival architecture.  It has also been known as Madison Apartments and as the Kensington Building.  It was listed on the National Register of Historic Places in 1988.

It is significant as a "good example of the Georgian Revival influence in commercial structures of the early Twentieth Century", and as a "good representative of the small city hotels designed by the H.L. Stevens Company of Chicago which designed many hotels and apartments across the nation."  It is also notable for having hosted WJAG, one of the oldest Midwest radio stations, during 1926–1944.

Notable visitors who have stayed in the hotel include Wendell Willkie, Thomas E. Dewey, Duke Ellington, John F. Kennedy, Jack Dempsey, Jascha Heifetz, Johnny Carson, and Ronald Reagan.

References

Hotel buildings on the National Register of Historic Places in Nebraska
Colonial Revival architecture in Nebraska
Georgian Revival architecture in Nebraska
Hotel buildings completed in 1926
Buildings and structures in Madison County, Nebraska
National Register of Historic Places in Madison County, Nebraska